Raynham Park railway station was a station in Norfolk, England. It was opened in the 19th century as part of the Midland and Great Northern Joint Railway main line from the Midlands to Great Yarmouth. It closed in 1959 along with the rest of the line.

History 

The station lay approximately half a mile from the small hamlets of Tatterford and Helhoughton but took its name from the Raynham Hall residence of Lord Townshend, erstwhile chairman of the Lynn & Fakenham Railway, some 1.5 miles away.

Present day 
The station buildings survive as a private residence. The present owners have added an old carriage on rails at the former station platform.

References

Disused railway stations in Norfolk
Former Midland and Great Northern Joint Railway stations
Railway stations in Great Britain opened in 1880
Railway stations in Great Britain closed in 1959